Filippos Filippou (born 29 September 1956) is a Greek-Cypriot long-distance runner. He competed in the marathon at the 1984 Summer Olympics.

References

1956 births
Living people
Place of birth missing (living people)
Cypriot male long-distance runners
Cypriot male marathon runners
Cypriot male cross country runners
Greek male long-distance runners
Greek male marathon runners
Greek male cross country runners
Olympic male marathon runners
Olympic athletes of Cyprus
Athletes (track and field) at the 1984 Summer Olympics
Commonwealth Games competitors for Cyprus
Athletes (track and field) at the 1982 Commonwealth Games
Mediterranean Games medalists in athletics
Balkan Athletics Championships winners
Mediterranean Games silver medalists for Cyprus
Athletes (track and field) at the 1983 Mediterranean Games